Cyclocheilichthys enoplos is a species of ray-finned fish in the genus Cyclocheilichthys from south-east Asia and the Malay Archipelago.

Footnotes 

 

enoplos
Fish of Thailand
Fish described in 1850